TerraAmazon is a free GIS software developed by Brazil´s National Institute for Space Research (INPE) and FUNCATE.

TerraAmazon is a tool designed to be a multi-user editor of geographic vectorial data. It was developed to improve the corporate production of geographic data in order to provide accurate measurement of deforestation, forest degradation, land use and land cover change and similar applications. The data accessed by TerraAmazon is stored in a TerraLib model database and is worked within an intranet client–server environment, typically using PostgreSQL.

History 

TerraAmazon was first developed by INPE and FUNCATE in early 2005. It was initially applied to PRODES project to monitor Brazil's Amazon rainforest. Due to its multi-user characteristic, it quickly conquered space, being used in other projects, such as DETER, DEGRAD and the Brazilian Second National Communication to the UNFCCC, among other relevant projects. TerraAmazon was made available to the public only in 2010. With the creation of INPE's Amazon Regional Center (CRA), located in Belém (Brazil), TerraAmazon reached international space, having regular trainings being held in CRA's facilities for both national and international specialists.

Nowadays, TerraAmazon is constantly being updated and enhanced, pursuing national and international approval.

File Formats 

TerraAmazon accepts vector files only in shapefile (.shp) format. Raster files are accepted in the following formats: geotiff files (.tiff), jpg files (.jpg), Spring Grid Files (.spr), binary RAW files (.raw) and ESRI ASCII Grid Files (.txt).

Language Availabilities 

TerraAmazon is available in English only.

Plugins 

Currently there are three plugins that available for TerraAmazon. They are also developed by INPE and FUNCATE and are provided within the installer of the system.

 Image Processing Plugin (DIP Plugin): contains tools to register and orthorectificate images, run segmentations, linear mixture models, etc.
 Cloud Detection: contains one single tool for cloud detection.
 TerraPrint (Beta version): contains tools to produce layouts with the data

History of Public Releases

External links
TerraAmazon - Official project web site
INPE
FUNCATE

Free GIS software